Cedar Township is a township in Jackson County, Kansas, USA.  As of the 2000 census, its population was 1,254.

History
The first permanent white settlement in Cedar Township was in 1855.

Geography
Cedar Township covers an area of 39.94 square miles (103.44 square kilometers); of this, 0.01 square miles (0.04 square kilometers) or 0.04 percent is water. The stream of Morgan Creek runs through this township.

Cities and towns
 Denison (southwest edge)
 Mayetta

Adjacent townships
 Garfield Township (northeast)
 Delaware Township, Jefferson County (east)
 Douglas Township (south)
 Lincoln Township (west)
 Franklin Township (northwest)

Cemeteries
The township contains three cemeteries: Cedar Grove, South Cedar and South Denison.

Major highways
 U.S. Route 75
 K-16

References
 U.S. Board on Geographic Names (GNIS)
 United States Census Bureau cartographic boundary files

External links
 US-Counties.com
 City-Data.com

Townships in Jackson County, Kansas
Townships in Kansas